Yin Hang is a Chinese table tennis player.

Formerly among the top junior players in the world, Yin currently represents Guangdong Chenjing in the China Table Tennis Super League.

References

Chinese male table tennis players
Year of birth missing (living people)
Living people
Table tennis players from Anshan